Little-T and One Track Mike (sometimes Little T & One Track Mike) was a hip-hop duo from New Jersey, USA.

History
Timothy Sullivan was given the nickname "Little T" as a child by his older brother. While attending Rutgers University in New Brunswick, New Jersey in 1998, Sullivan introduced himself to dorm mate Michael Flannery, "the lanky kid on the next floor with the computer and four-track", looking for someone to help him launch a career in rap. Prior to the release of their debut album, the group performed at the last four stops of the Vans Warped Tour in August 2001. The band's first single "Shaniqua" found moderate success on MTV.

Subsequently, frontman Tim Sullivan performed in a "bad ass rock and roll" group named Homeschool and an "acoustic twangcore" project named Mudfite before going solo and signing with ANTI- Records under the stage name Tim Fite.

Discography

Albums
Fome Is Dape (2001)

Singles and promo
Fome Is Dape Sampler 1 (2001)
Fome Is Dape Sampler 2 (2001)
"Shaniqua" (2001)
"Wings" (2001)

References

External links
Little-T And One Track Mike on Atlantic Records
Little-T And One Track Mike interview with Kristi Singer
Little-T And One Track Mike interview with Christopher Wilcha
Little-T And One Track Mike interview with VH1

American hip hop groups
Musical groups from New Jersey
American musical duos
Hip hop duos
Musical groups established in 2000
Musical groups disestablished in 2002
2000 establishments in New Jersey